Aqua and Aria is a utopian science fantasy manga series written and illustrated by Kozue Amano published between 2001 and 2008 by Enix then by Mag Garden. Set in the early 24th century on a terraformed Mars, now called Aqua, it depicts the life of a young woman named Akari as a trainee gondolier tour guide, or undine. It was adapted by Hal Film Maker as a 54-episode anime television series broadcast between 2005 and 2008, comprising two seasons, an original video animation (OVA), and a third season, all directed by Jun'ichi Satō with music direction by Shigeharu Sasago and Takeshi Senoo. A new OVA, called Aria the Avvenire, was released in the 10th anniversary Blu-Ray Box sets of the anime series between 24 December 2015 and 24 June 2016. The discography of the Aria television series consists of five studio albums, one compilation album, one tribute album, and nine maxi singles.

The core of the discography is the three original soundtrack albums, covering the three anime seasons, produced by Flying Dog/JVC Entertainment and released in 2005, 2006, and 2008, respectively. Most of the music on the soundtrack albums was composed, performed, and arranged by Takeshi Senoo and Choro Club, a Japanese choro band that previously created the music of the anime adaptation of Yokohama Kaidashi Kikō, another futuristic slice of life story. The other two studio albums containing piano versions of music from the soundtrack albums and theme sounds, released in 2006 and 2008, respectively. A vocal compilation album collecting the songs and lyric-less vocal themes from first two anime seasons was released in 2006.

Nine maxi singles were released, seven of them produced by Flying Dog/JVC Entertainment, covering the opening and endings themes of the three anime seasons and the OVA. The remaining two, produced by 5pb. Records, were the opening and ending theme songs of the two video game adaptations. One tribute album was released to mark the passing of Eri Kawai in 2008.

Soundtracks
Several soundtrack albums were released for the anime television series Aria. Most of the releases charted in the Oricon charts, with the highest ranking album being Aria the Natural Vocal Song Collection at 30th, and the highest ranking single being "Euforia", the opening theme for Aria the Natural, at 18th.

Aria the Animation singles and album
The opening and closing themes of the first anime season, Aria the Animation, were both released as singles on 21 October 2005 under the Victor Entertainment label, and peak ranked 25th and 40th on the Oricon singles chart, respectively. The opening theme single performed by Yui Makino included "Undine" and "Symphony" in both vocal and instrumental versions, with lyrics written by Eri Kawai and Rieko Itou, respectively. The ending theme single performed by Round Table feat. Nino included "Rainbow" and "Just for You" in both vocal and instrumental versions, with lyrics written by Katsutoshi Kitagawa and Rieko Itou, respectively.

The soundtrack for the first season, Aria the Animation Original Soundtrack, was released under Victor Entertainment label on 23 November 2005 and peak ranked 102nd on the Oricon albums chart. Choro Club feat. Takeshi Senoo performed all the tracks except #2, #9, and #25, which were performed by Yui Makino, Eri Kawai, and Round Table, respectively.

The two singles and the albums were re-released on 22 July 2009 by Victor Entertainment.

Aria the Natural singles and album
The opening and closing themes of the second anime season, Aria the Natural, were both released as singles on 26 April 2006 under the Victor Entertainment label, and peak ranked 18th and 23rd on the Oricon singles chart, respectively. The opening theme single performed by Yui Makino included "Euforia" and "Amefuri Hana" in both vocal and instrumental versions, with lyrics written by Eri Kawai and Yui Makino, respectively. The ending theme single performed by Round Table feat. Nino included "Natsu Machi" and "Shiosai" in both vocal and instrumental versions, with lyrics written by Katsutoshi Kitagawa and Rieko Itou, respectively.

The soundtrack for the second season, Aria the Natural Original Soundtrack: Due, was released under the Victor Entertainment label on 24 May 2006, and peak ranked 48th on the Oricon albums chart. Choro Club feat. Takeshi Senoo performed all of the tracks except #2, #13, and #24, which were performed by Yui Makino, Eri Kawai, and Round Table, respectively. "Due" is Italian for "two."

The two singles and the albums were re-released on 22 July 2009 by Victor Entertainment.

Aria Piano Collection: Stagione
An album of piano music titled Aria Piano Collection: Stagione label was released on 2 August 2006 under the Victor Entertainment label, and peak ranked 115th on the Oricon albums chart. It had piano versions of music from the first two seasons of Aria, with a focus on different seasons of a year on Aqua, performed by Takeshi Senoo and Mina Kubota. Piano tracks are interspersed by "Stagione" tracks which are comments from the voice actors reprising their roles from the anime adaptation. "Stagione" is Italian for "season".

The album was re-released on 22 July 2009 by Victor Entertainment.

Aria the Natural Vocal Song Collection
An album, compilation of vocal music titled Aria the Natural Vocal Song Collection was released on 6 September 2006 under the Victor Entertainment label, and peak ranked 30th on the Oricon albums chart. It compiled songs and vocals themes from the two first seasons, new versions of previously released ones, and an original composition with Erino Hazuki, Ryō Hirohashi, and Chiwa Saitō reprising their roles from the anime adaptation as main performers.

Aria the Natural: Tooi Yume no Mirage OP & ED Single
A single of the opening and ending themes of the visual novel Aria The Natural: Tooi Yume no Mirage was released 6 October 2006 under the Geneon Entertainment label, and peak ranked 74th on the Oricon singles chart. It included vocal and instrumental versions of "Blue Blue Wave" and "Sono Chiisana Chiisana Hohoemi de" performed by Kaori, with music and lyrics by Chiyomaru Shikura for both songs.

Aria the OVA: Arietta OP & ED Single
A single of the opening and ending themes of Aria the OVA: Arietta was released 21 September 2007 under the Victor Entertainment label, and peak ranked 35th on the Oricon singles chart. It included "Nana iro no Sora o" performed by Sonorous and "Ashita, Yūgure Made" performed by Erino Hazuki, both in vocal and instrumental versions, with lyrics by Sonorous and Rieko Itou, respectively.

Aria the Origination singles and album
The opening and closing themes of the third anime season, Aria the Origination, were both released as singles under the Victor Entertainment label on 23 January 2008, and peak ranked 20th and 26th on the Oricon singles chart, respectively. The opening theme single performed by Yui Makino included "Spirale" and "Yokogao (acoustic version)" in both vocal and instrumental versions, with lyrics by Eri Kawai and Rieko Itou, respectively. The ending theme single performed by Akino Arai included "Kin no Nami Sen no Nami" and "Torikago no Yume" in both vocal and instrumental versions, with lyrics by Akino Arai.

The soundtrack for the third season, Aria the Origination Original Soundtrack: Tre, was released under the Victor Entertainment label on 20 February 2008, and peak ranked 49th on the Oricon albums chart. Choro Club feat. Takeshi Senoo performed all of the tracks except numbers 1, 2, 14, 21, and 22, which were performed by Sonorous (#1 and #21), Yui Makino (#2), Ryō Hirohashi (#14), and Akino Arai (#22). "Tre" is Italian for "three."

Aria the Origination Piano Collection II: Di Partenza
A second album of piano music titled Aria the Origination Piano Collection II: Di Partenza was released under the Victor Entertainment label on 26 March 2008, and peak ranked 56th on the Oricon albums chart. It had piano versions of music from the third and final season performed by Takeshi Senoo for all tracks except numbers 2, 6, and 9, which were performed by Mina Kubota (#2 and #9) and Sonorous (#6). "Di partenza" is Italian for "of departures."

Aria the Crepuscolo Original Soundtrack

Aria the Origination: Aoi Hoshi no Il Cielo OP & ED Single
A single of the opening and ending themes of the visual novel Aria the Origination: Aoi Hoshi no El Cielo was released under the Media Factory label on 25 July 2008, and peak ranked 84th on the Oricon singles chart. It included vocal and instrumental versions of "Graceful Way", "Il Cielo", and "Hana no Saku Hoshi" performed by Kicco, Kana Hanazawa, and Mio Isayama, respectively, with lyrics by Chiyomaru Shikura for the first and the third songs and Daisuke Mizuno for the second.

Himawari
A tribute album to Eri Kawai titled Himawari was released on 24 December 2008 under the Victor Entertainment label, and peak ranked 151st on the Oricon albums chart. All tracks except numbers 11 and 12 are related to the Aria anime adaption. Tracks 3, 7, and 11 are "sample versions" made for the final singers, and tracks 13 through 16 are live versions of songs performed during Aria the Concert. All songs and themes are performed by Eri Kawai, who also wrote the lyrics for all songs except track 7. The album cover was drawn by Kozue Amano, the writer and illustrator of Aqua and Aria.

A portion of the profits from the album were donated to WWF Japan.

Aria the Box
A compilation triple album titled Aria the Box was released on 23 September 2009 under the Victor Entertainment label, and peak ranked 25th on the Oricon albums chart. The first CD contains the 25 best hits soundtracks selected by the anime adaptation director Jun'ichi Satō, the second one the theme and insert songs from the three anime seasons and OVA, and the last CD contains the compositions which were not used in the anime.

Release details

Reception
On 30 November 2007 was held Aria the Concert in the Nippon Seinen-kan hall. Most of the performers of the soundtracks of the anime franchise were present.

See also
 List of Aria episodes
 List of Aria chapters

Notes and references

External links
 Yui Makino website 
 Round Table website 
 Choro Club website 
 Takeshi Senoo website 
 Mina Kubota website 
 Sonorous website 

Anime soundtracks
Film and television discographies
Discographies of Japanese artists
Lists of soundtracks